Route 113 is a highway in northwestern Missouri.  Its northern terminus is at U.S. Route 136 in Burlington Junction; its southern terminus is at U.S. Route 59 east of Mound City.

Route description

History

Major intersections

References

113
Transportation in Holt County, Missouri
Transportation in Nodaway County, Missouri